Albannach, Scottish Gaelic for "Scottish," is a band formed in 2005 in Glasgow, Scotland. Their traditional music is heavily percussive, driven by bass drums, bodhráns, and a single bagpipe. Albannach released their first album, the eponymous Albannach, in 2006. Since, the band has independently released four additional studio albums and frequently performs music at Highland games, Scottish festivals, and Celtic cultural events across North America and the United Kingdom. With little exception, Albannach's discography is instrumental, though several vocal songs are included in live shows.

The band championed the cause of Scottish independence during the 2014 independence referendum, releasing an EP titled Independence to support the "yes" vote. Some songs, such as A'Maighdeann Bharrach (The Maiden of Barra), are sung in Scottish Gaelic.

The band has been used as extras in a Discovery Channel documentary retelling of ancient history.

After a 2011 show at the Glasgow Highland Games in Glasgow, Kentucky, band member Jamesie Johnston was stabbed in the midsection and leg by a drunk and belligerent fan, leading to his hospitalization. Johnston recovered, and the assailant was sentenced to 12 years for the first-degree assault.

Members

Current members 
 Jamesie Johnston – bass drum, backing vocals (2005–present)
 Donnie MacNeil – bag pipe, additional drums (2005–present)
 Jacquie Holland – lead vocals, bass rhythm drum (2005–present)
 Drew "DidgeriDrew" Reid – didgeridoo (2005–present)
 Nick Watson – drums (2019–present)

Former and intermittent members 
 Kyle Gray – drums (2005–2009)
 Colin Walker – drums (2009–2018)
 Aya Thorne – bodhrán, tambourine (2005–2015)
 Davey "Ramone" Morrison – bodhrán, backing baritone vocals (intermittent)

Works

Discography

Studio albums
Albannach (2006)
Eye of the Storm (2007)
The Sub-Zero Sessions (EP) (2010)
Bareknuckle Pipes & Drums  (2011)
Evolution (EP) (2016)
Gaelgael (2019)

Live albums
The Mighty Nach LIVE (2008)
Runs In The Blood (2013)

Video
Albannach Unleashed: Live At Grandfather Mountain (2006)
Circa B.C. (2007)
Scotumentary (2014)

References

External links
Albannach Official Website

Scottish folk music groups
Celtic music groups
Renaissance fair performers